The 2020 Kehoe Cup was an inter-county hurling competition in the province of Leinster and Ulster, played by six county teams.

The Kehoe Cup is ranked below the Walsh Cup. It took place between November 2019 and January 2020.  were the winners.

Format
The teams are drawn into two groups of three teams. Each team plays the other teams in its group once, earning 2 points for a win and 1 for a draw. The top two teams in each group advance to the semi-finals.

Group stage

Group 1

Group 2

Knockout stage

References

Kehoe Cup
Kehoe Cup